South Pacific Sea Level and Climate Monitoring Project (SPSLCMP) is a project initiated by government of Australia. The primary goal of the project is to provide accurate, long term records of the variance of the sea level in the Pacific and South Pacific oceans.

Participants 
There are 14 Pacific islands participating in the sea level and climate monitoring project. These include:
 Cook Islands
 Federated States of Micronesia
 Fiji
 Kiribati
 Marshall Islands
 Nauru
 Niue
 Palau
 Papua New Guinea
 Samoa
 Solomon Islands
 Tonga
 Tuvalu
 Vanuatu

References

Pacific Ocean
Climatological research
Climate change in Australia